Team Bianchi was a makeshift team that was put together from the remnants of the Coast team in time for the 2003 Tour de France.

Team Coast had been unable to pay the salaries of their riders and Bianchi took over the team and the role of title sponsor. Coast had recently signed Jan Ullrich following his departure from  after his drunk driving and amphetamine use. During the 2003 tour while riding for Bianchi, Ullrich placed second to Lance Armstrong by just 61 seconds, his closest ever margin in any of Armstrong's seven victorious years. In the process, Ullrich also managed to upstage Alexander Vinokourov, Telekom's highest-placed rider, who finished third.

Team Bianchi had planned to continue on as a professional road racing team.  However, Ullrich's return to his former team Telekom (later T-Mobile and ), as well as the departure of Ángel Casero led to the demise of Team Bianchi as they now lacked the star power necessary to justify a top-tier team.

Major wins

2000
Grand Prix Pino Cerami, Jan Bratkowski
Stage 12 Tour de Langkawi, Jan Bratkowski

2001
Stage 4 Paris - Nice, Alex Zuelle

2002

2003
Profronde Stiphout, Jan Ullrich
Rund um Köln, Jan Ullrich
Stage 1b International Niedersachsen-Rundfahrt, Thorsten Wilhelms
Stage 1 Bayern-Rundfahrt, Thomas Liese
Stage 1 Tour of Austria, Steffen Radochla
Stage 12 Tour de France, Jan Ullrich

Notable riders

References

Bianchi
Cycling teams established in 2000
Cycling teams disestablished in 2003
Cycling teams based in Germany
Bianchi (company)